Residents for Uttlesford (R4U) is a localist political party in the United Kingdom. The party was launched in 2014, and formed from a number of residents groups in the area. The party is based in the Uttlesford administrative district in Essex and promotes a localist agenda that seeks to give residents a greater say in the future of their district. Residents for Uttlesford has elected representation at multiple levels of local government: Uttlesford District Council, Essex County Council and various town and parish councils, including the councils for both towns in Uttlesford, Saffron Walden and Great Dunmow.

Background
For the 2013 UK local elections, Uttlesford residents stood two of their own candidates on an Independent platform. Both were elected - John Lodge to Essex County Council and Joanna Parry to Uttlesford District Council.

Following this, in 2014 the local residents groups formed their own party, Residents for Uttlesford, so that they could more easily stand a larger number of candidates across the electoral District. A number of existing councillors crossed the aisle to join the new party when it was launched.

Residents for Uttlesford cite other successful local independent political parties in the UK as the inspiration for their model, including the Loughton Residents Association in Essex, Residents Associations of Epsom and Ewell in Surrey, and Independents for Frome with their Flatpack Democracy model.

Electoral history
Residents for Uttlesford fought their first local elections in May 2015, with candidates standing for seats in both Uttlesford District Council and Saffron Walden Town Council. They won a majority of the seats on the town council and became the opposition in the district council.

A by-election was held on 16 February 2017 in the ward of Elsenham and Henham of the Uttlesford District Council, following the resignation of the two councillors from that ward who were members of the Liberal Democrats. Residents for Uttlesford stood candidates for the first time in that ward and won a landslide victory, with 60% of the votes cast.

In the 2019 Uttlesford District Council election, the party gained control of  Uttlesford District Council after winning 26 out of 39 of the available seats. They also maintained control of the Saffron Walden Town Council, winning 15 out of the 16 seats. The remaining seat was won by the Green Party, whose candidate did not defeat Residents for Uttlesford, but was elected as the seventh councillor for the seven-seat ward of Saffron Walden Shire, in which only six Residents for Uttlesford candidates stood.

In October 2019, three Residents for Uttlesford district councillors serving in the cabinet, including two who also sat on Saffron Walden Town Council, left the party to join the Green Party.

In the 2021 Essex County Council election, Residents for Uttlesford gained two of the four Essex County Council seats in Uttlesford from the Conservatives.

Stansted airport expansion
Uttlesford District Council, under Residents for Uttlesford leadership and an all-party supported Climate Emergency policy, refused planning permission for the controversial expansion of Stansted Airport to 43 million passengers per year, which was later overturned on appeal. 

Planning permission had previously been approved by the planning committee of the previous Conservative council administration. After many widespread concerns were expressed about the decision, that administration failed to issue the formal planning approval notice before the council changed political composition in May 2019. The planning committee of the new Uttlesford administration reviewed the planning application again and overturned the previous approval. The council's refusal was then overturned again in 2021 by the Planning Inspectorate, who awarded costs to the airport's owners after a High Court appeal was rejected.

References

External links

Epsom & Ewell Residents Associations
Loughton Residents Association
Independents for Frome

Uttlesford
Local government in Essex
Politics of Essex
Locally based political parties in England
Political parties established in 2014
2014 establishments in England